Hunting Whales is the debut LP from New Zealand band The Checks. The album was released in New Zealand, United Kingdom, and Australia on 1 October 2007. It reached number 21 on the New Zealand album charts. Hunting Whales was released in Germany and Switzerland on 23 November 2007. The album features the previously released singles "What You Heard" and "Take Me There".

Track listing
 Mercedes Children
 Take Me There
 What You Heard
 Tired From Sleeping
 Where Has She Gone
 Terribly Easy
 Honest Man
 See Me Peter
 Don't Wait
 Hunting Whales
 Memory Walking

2007 debut albums
The Checks (band) albums